Piet Plessis is a small town in the North West Province of South Africa. It lies adjacent to rural road R377. It was founded in 1839 by a group of Trekboers led by Piet Plessis of Laingsburg, Western Cape. From 1969 it was the site of a MGM-29 Sergeant Ballistic Missile battery of the SADF, co located with three Infantry Companies of the 5 SAI, a Medium Artillery battery, and an SAAF Forward Radar and Signals Squadron.

References 

Populated places in the Kagisano-Molopo Local Municipality